Never Forget My Love is the eighth studio album by English singer and songwriter Joss Stone, released on 11 February 2022 by Bay Street Records.

Critical reception

AllMusic editor Andy Kellman described Never Forget My Love as Stone's "most R&B-oriented set of original material since Introducing Joss Stone [...] As with that 2011 full-length, these songs come across as deliberately crafted in a way that differentiates them from the much greater volume of comparatively off-the-cuff material in Stone's catalog. The singer sounds more comfortable than she has in some time, whether she's referencing prime Burt Bacharach (with whom Stone performed in 2019), classic Memphis soul, or the Staple Singers, or bringing to mind a cross between Betty Wright and Bill Withers (specifically on the title song, a highlight). For the most part, this is full-tilt Stone – a delight for those who want to hear her let it all out, even when the song doesn't necessarily call for it."

Track listing

Personnel
Credits adapted from the liner notes of Never Forget My Love.

Musicians

 Joss Stone – lead vocals ; backing vocals 
 Chad Cromwell – drums ; percussion 
 Michael Rhodes – bass guitar 
 Tom Bukovac – electric guitar ; acoustic guitar 
 Dan Dugmore – electric guitar ; pedal steel guitar 
 Dave Stewart – acoustic guitar ; electric guitar ; acoustic 12-string ; backing vocals 
 Mike Rojas – piano ; Rhodes ; clavinet ; B3 organ ; tubular bells ; accordion 
 Steve Herrman – trumpet 
 John Hinchey – trombone 
 Jesse Samler – percussion 
 Mike Bradford – percussion ; acoustic guitar 
 David Davidson – violin 
 David Angell – violin 
 Jenny Bifano – violin 
 Kristin Wilkinson – viola 
 Monisa Angell – viola 
 Carole Rabinowitz – cello 
 Steve Patrick – trumpet, flugelhorn 
 Jennifer Kummer – French horn 
 Anna Spina – French horn 
 Barry Green – trombone 
 Matt Jefferson – trombone 
 Sam Levine – flute, clarinet 
 Tim Lauer – harpsichord ; percussion, celeste ; Mellotron ; orchestration
 Artia Lockett – backing vocals 
 Shaneka Hamilton – backing vocals 
 Theron 'Therry' Thomas – backing vocals 
 Stephen Lamb – score preparation

Technical
 Dave Stewart – production, additional mixing
 John McBride – recording, tracking
 Steve Greenwell – mixing at Steve Greenwell's (Asbury Park, New Jersey)
 Michael Bradford – additional mixing
 Lowell Reynolds – additional recording
 Allen Ditto – recording assistance
 Jesse Samler – recording assistance, mixing assistance
 Taylor Poller – string recording, brass recording
 Ross Collier – additional overdubs, woodwind recording
 Christian Wright – mastering at Abbey Road Studios (London)

Artwork
 Kristin Burns – cover photography
 Allen Clark – additional photography
 Laurence Stevens – sleeve design, typography
 LSD Studio – graphic artwork

Charts

Release history

Notes

References

2022 albums
Albums produced by David A. Stewart
Joss Stone albums